Encore is the thirty-second and final studio album by American singer Wanda Jackson. Produced by fellow Rock and Roll Hall of Fame members Joan Jett and Kenny Laguna, the album was released on August 20, 2021 via Big Machine and Blackheart Records. It is Jackson's first album in nine years following 2012's Unfinished Business.

Background
The album was recorded in 2019, prior to Jackson's announcement that she was retiring from performing, following a previously undisclosed stroke which occurred in late 2018. When it was announced in June  2021, Jackson commented on the experience: "Right around the time I retired from performing and what I thought was the end of my career, I found myself back to writing songs with some of the great writers in Nashville. The songs you hear are truly my life story. This is the first time I have ever inserted so much of my personal life into my music."

Promotion
The album's first single "It Keeps Right On a-Hurtin'" was originally a 1962 hit for American country pop singer Johnny Tillotson. "Good Girl Down" which features Angaleena Presley and Candi Carpenter, was written by Jackson and Presley in 2018 and originally appeared on Presley's second studio album Wrangled. The album is set for release on August 20, 2021 via Big Machine Records and Blackheart Records. She has said it will be her final album.

Track listing

References

2021 albums
Big Machine Records albums
Blackheart Records albums
Joan Jett
Wanda Jackson albums